In Ohio, State Route 90 may refer to:
Interstate 90 in Ohio, the only Ohio highway numbered 90 since about 1962
Ohio State Route 90 (1923), now SR 193 (North Kingsville to Youngstown), SR 170 (Youngstown to Petersburg), and SR 617 (Petersburg to Pennsylvania)

90